"Two Sisters" is the third track from the Kinks' 1967 album, Something Else by the Kinks. The song was written by Ray Davies.

Lyrics

In "Two Sisters", the singer compares sisters Sybilla and Priscilla. Sybilla is a swinging, single "wayward lass", while Priscilla is a married housewife. Priscilla is tired of facing "the drudgery of being wed", with her being said to be "so jealous of her sister." The singer compares how "Sybilla looked into her mirror; Priscilla looked into the washing machine" and how "Sybilla looked into the wardrobe; Priscilla looked into the frying pan." Priscilla then "threw away her dirty dishes just to be free again [and threw away] her women's weekly magazines just to be free again and put the children in the nursery just to be free again." However, upon seeing her children, she "decided she was better off" than her wild sister. She's "no longer jealous of her sister."

The two characters in the lyrics of "Two Sisters" (Sybilla and Priscilla) were inspired by Ray Davies and his brother, Dave Davies. Ray was more introverted (and was the only one of the two married) while Dave was a party animal who was very outgoing. This clash of personalities was often the cause of many band in-fights, which would come out in their songs (ex. "Dandy", which is often thought to be about Dave).

Music

"Two Sisters", sung by Ray Davies, is notable for its use of harpsichord (which was also used in the song "Village Green", a song recorded around the same time, but saved for The Kinks Are the Village Green Preservation Society). It was also the first time strings were used in a Kinks track.

Release and reception

"Two Sisters" saw release in May 1967, on both the French EP, "Mister Pleasant", and as the American B-side of "Waterloo Sunset". Later that year, it appeared on the album Something Else by the Kinks. The track has since appeared on Picture Book.

AllMusics Stephen Thomas Erlewine said that the track was "allegorical" and a "stunner".

Although never a regular part of their live set, the group did perform the song (live vocals over backing track) on the BBC2 TV show Colour Me Pop in July 1968.

Personnel
According to band researcher Doug Hinman, except where noted:The KinksRay Davies lead and backing vocals
Dave Davies backing vocal, electric guitar
Pete Quaife backing vocal, bass
Mick Avory drumsAdditional musicians'
Nicky Hopkins harpsichord
David Whitaker string arrangement
Unnamed session musicians cello and viola

References

Sources

 
 
 

The Kinks songs
Song recordings produced by Shel Talmy
Songs written by Ray Davies
Song recordings produced by Ray Davies
1967 songs
Baroque pop songs